The following lists events that happened during 1887 in the Congo Free State.

Incumbent
King – Leopold II of Belgium
Administrator-General, then Governor-General – Camille Janssen

Events

See also

 Congo Free State
 History of the Democratic Republic of the Congo

References

Sources

 
Congo Free State
Congo Free State